is a Japanese manga series written and illustrated by Yoshihiro Togashi. The series tells the story of Yusuke Urameshi, a teenage delinquent who is struck and killed by a car while attempting to save a child's life. After a number of tests presented to him by Koenma, the son of the ruler of the afterlife Underworld, Yusuke is revived and appointed the title of "Underworld Detective", with which he must investigate various cases involving demons and apparitions in the Human World. The manga becomes more focused on martial arts battles and tournaments as it progresses. Togashi began creating YuYu Hakusho around November 1990, basing the series on his interests in the occult and horror films and an influence of Buddhist mythology.

The manga was originally serialized in Shueisha's Weekly Shōnen Jump from December 1990 to July 1994. The series consists of 175 chapters collected in 19 tankōbon volumes. In North America, the manga ran completely in Viz's Shonen Jump from January 2003 to January 2010. An anime adaptation consisting of 112 television episodes was directed by Noriyuki Abe and co-produced by Fuji Television, Yomiko Advertising, and Studio Pierrot. The television series originally aired on Japan's Fuji TV network from October 1992 to December 1994. It was later licensed in North America by Funimation in 2001, where it aired on popular Cartoon Network blocks including Adult Swim and later Toonami. The television series has also been broadcast in various other countries around the world. The YuYu Hakusho franchise has spawned two animated films, a series of original video animations (OVAs), audio albums, video games, and other merchandise.

YuYu Hakusho has been well received. The manga had over 78 million copies in circulation by 2022, making it one of the best-selling manga series of all time. It won the 39th Shogakukan Manga Award for the shōnen category in 1993. The animated series won the Animage Anime Grand Prix prize for best anime in 1994 and 1995. The anime series has been watched by a large audience in Japan and a wide range of age groups in the United States. The anime has been given mostly positive reviews by critics in North America, complimenting its writing, characters, comedy, and amount of action.

Plot

YuYu Hakusho follows Yusuke Urameshi, a 14-year-old street-brawling delinquent who, in an uncharacteristic act of altruism, is hit by a car and killed in an attempt to save a young boy by pushing him out of the way. His ghost is greeted by Botan, a woman who introduces herself as the pilot of the River Styx, who ferries souls to the  where they may be judged for the afterlife. Botan informs Yusuke that his act had caught even the Underworld by surprise and that there was not yet a place made for him in either heaven or hell. Thus Koenma, son of the Underworld's ruler King Enma, offers Yusuke a chance to return to his body through a series of tests. Yusuke succeeds with the help of his friends Keiko Yukimura and Kazuma Kuwabara. Soon Yusuke is off on his first case, retrieving three treasures stolen from the Underworld by a gang of demons: Hiei, Kurama, and Goki. Yusuke collects the three treasures with the aid of his new technique, the Rei Gun, a shot of aura or  fired mentally from his index finger. He then travels to the mountains in search of the aged, female martial arts master Genkai. Together with his rival Kuwabara, Yusuke fights through a tournament organized by Genkai to find her successor. Yusuke uses the competition as a cover to search for Rando, a demon who steals the techniques of martial arts masters and kills them. Yusuke defeats Rando in the final round of the tournament and trains with Genkai for several months, gaining more mastery over his aura.

Yusuke's next case sends him on a rescue mission, where he meets Toguro, a human turned into a demon. Team Urameshi, consisting of Yusuke, Kuwabara, Kurama, Hiei, and a disguised Genkai, traverse through the strenuous early rounds to face Team Toguro in the finals and win the tournament. They learn that Team Toguro's owner, Sakyo, was attempting to win to create a large hole from the Human World to the Demon Plane and allow countless demons through. With his loss, Sakyo destroys the tournament arena, killing himself in the process.

After the tournament, Yusuke returns home but has little time to rest as he is challenged to a fight by three teenagers possessing superhuman powers and who end up taking the detective hostage. Kuwabara and the others rescue him and learn that the whole scenario was a test put on by Genkai. It is disclosed that Shinobu Sensui, Yusuke's predecessor as Underworld Detective, has recruited six other powerful beings to help him take over where Sakyo left off, opening a hole to the Demon Plane to cause genocide of the human race. Yusuke and his friends challenge and defeat Sensui's associates one-by-one, culminating in a final battle between the two detectives. Sensui kills Yusuke then retreats into the newly opened portal to the Demon Plane. Yusuke is reborn as a partial demon, discovering that his ancestor passed down a recessive gene that would hide until an heir with sufficient power surfaced when his demonic lineage would be revealed. Yusuke travels to the Demon Plane and defeats Sensui with the aid of his ancestor who takes control of Yusuke's body to finish the fight.

As they return to the Human World, Yusuke is stripped of his detective title in fear that Yusuke's demon blood could cause him to go on a rampage in the Human World. Yusuke, unsettled at having been controlled by his ancestor Raizen, accepts an offer by Raizen's followers to return to the Demon Plane. Raizen, desiring a successor to his territory, is on the brink of dying of starvation, a death that would topple the delicate political balance of the three ruling powers of the Demon Plane. Hiei and Kurama are summoned by the other two rulers, Mukuro and Yomi, respectively, to prepare for an inevitable war. The three protagonists train in the realm for one year, during which time Raizen dies and Yusuke inherits his territory. Yusuke takes the initiative and proposes a fighting tournament to name the true ruler of the Demon Plane, which is agreed upon by Mukuro and Yomi. During the tournament, Yusuke and Yomi meet in the second elimination round where Yusuke is defeated. Yusuke hopes a similar competition will be held every few years to determine the Demon Plane's ruler. 

Two years later, Yusuke returns to the Human World while Hiei stays with Mukuro and protects humans who have accidentally wandered into the Demon Plane. After learning that King Enma was falsifying reports on demon activity against humans in order to justify keeping the two separated, Koenma takes over his father's position and allows access between the Demon Plane and Human World. Genkai dies and leaves her estate to the cast. The story ends with Yusuke and his friends reuniting at a beach.

Production
Author Yoshihiro Togashi stated that he began working on YuYu Hakusho during a period of time around November 1990, though he forgot the exact time. He had recently completed the serialization of his romantic comedy Ten de Shōwaru Cupid in Weekly Shōnen Jump. Having felt somewhat intimidated by some of his more popular fellow authors during this manga's run, Togashi realized he would need to create a fighting manga to both gain popularity and write something he enjoyed. As a fan of the occult and horror films, he desired to write and illustrate a new manga based on his interests. Togashi had previously published an occult detective fiction manga titled Occult Tanteidan, of which he referenced positive reception from readers as a reason for continuing to create manga. When first producing YuYu Hakusho, he did not have a clear idea of what he wanted to call it. He used the tentative title "How to be a Ghost" while presenting rough drafts to his editors. Once given the go-ahead to begin publication, Togashi proposed "YuYu-Ki (Poltergeist Chronicles)" for the title, as there would be battles with demons and it would be a play on the title SaiYu-Ki. Because a series with a similar name (Chin-Yu-Ki) had already begun publication, Togashi quickly created an alternative: "YuYu Hakusho (Poltergeist Report)". He commented that he could have used "Den (Legend)" or "Monogatari (Story)", but "Hakusho (Report)" was the first thing that came to his mind. He contiguously developed the names of the main characters by skimming through a dictionary and taking out kanji characters he found appealing. "Yusuke Urameshi" is a pun, "Kazuma Kuwabara" is a combination of two professional baseball players, and "Hiei" and "Kurama" are "just names that popped into [Togashi's] head". When he introduced the latter two characters in volume three, the author had early plans to make Kurama a main character but was not certain about Hiei.

The manga's shift from occult detective fiction to the martial arts genre after Yusuke's death and revival in the early chapters was planned by Togashi from the beginning. He took this idea from the series Kinnikuman, which began largely as a comedy before concentrating more on action. Togashi's intention was to establish the main characters and familiarize the reader with them before placing them in tense, physical conflicts. His editor at the time was nervous of him beginning the manga this way and recommended he transition to a battle-focused plot after about 30 chapters. YuYu Hakusho borrows many elements from Asian folklore, particularly Buddhist beliefs in the afterlife. Togashi came up with the concept of the Ningenkai (Human World), Reikai (Underworld), and Makai (Demon Plane) as being parallel planes of existence in the manga's universe. He thought of them as places that one could not easily travel between using modern technology, but rather as a spirit lacking a material body. However, the idea for the "territory" powers from the Sensui story arc was parodied from a separate, unnamed work by Yasutaka Tsutsui. For his drawing materials, Togashi used drafting ink and Kabura pens throughout the creation of the series. While his style of artwork began with screentone, he gradually developed into minimalism. As the series progressed, he would draw figures and faces very detailed or "cartoony, sketchy and jumping with action" whenever he desired such effects.

During the years he worked on YuYu Hakusho, Togashi would calculate the personal time he had based on a formula of four hours per page without scripting and five hours of sleep per night. He wrote in his own dōjinshi Yoshirin de Pon! that he stopped the production on YuYu Hakusho out of selfishness. The author had originally wanted to end the manga in December 1993, at the climax of the Sensui arc. Although there was not a large demand from the editorial staff, Togashi was under a great deal of personal stress at certain points of the series' run, particularly during its final six months of publication. He claimed that, beginning with the Dark Tournament arc, inconsistent sleep resulting from overwork was causing him health problems. He noted himself as being very ill while working on the color pages for Yusuke's match with Chu. There were also many instances where he would create nearly entire manuscripts by himself, such as Yusuke's meeting with Raizen and the battle between Kurama and Karasu. The editors of the publication tried to make Togashi reconsider cancelling Yu Yu Hakusho, though he justified his decision by stating that it would simply be replaced by another popular series. Togashi was relieved at the conclusion of the manga. The author claimed to not have been involved in the production of the YuYu Hakusho anime adaptation due to his own work schedule. He stated that he was greatly impressed by Shigeru Chiba's voice depiction of Kuwabara, admitting that the voice actor understood the character better than Togashi himself.

Media

Manga

The YuYu Hakusho manga series was written and illustrated by Yoshihiro Togashi and originally serialized by Shueisha in the shōnen manga magazine Weekly Shōnen Jump from December 3, 1990, to July 25, 1994. The manga consists of 175 chapters spanning 19 tankōbon with the first one being released on April 10, 1991, and the last one released on December 12, 1994. Between August 4, 2004, and March 4, 2005, Shueisha released the kanzenban (complete) editions of the manga. Each of the 15 kanzenban volumes features a new cover and more chapters than the tankōbon edition. YuYu Hakusho has also been published as part of the Shueisha Jump Remix series of magazine-style books. Nine volumes were released between December 22, 2008, and April 27, 2009. A bunkobon version began publication on November 18, 2010, and was finished on October 18, 2011.

An English translation of the YuYu Hakusho manga was serialized in North America by Viz Media in the American Shonen Jump magazine, where it debuted in its inaugural January 2003 issue and ended in January 2010. Viz released all 19 collected volumes of the English manga between May 13, 2003, and March 2, 2010. A total of 176 chapters exist in this format due to Viz treating the extra non-numbered chapter "YuYu Hakusho Tales: Two Shot" found in volume seven (which tells the story of how Hiei and Kurama first met) as the 64th chapter. Viz later re-released the series digitally as part of their digital manga releases between 2013 and 2014 and later added it to ComiXology's digital releases. The YuYu Hakusho manga has additionally been licensed and published across Asia and Europe. A French translation from Kana, for example, began publication in 1997.

Anime

The Yu Yu Hakusho anime adaptation was directed by Noriyuki Abe and co-produced by Fuji Television, Yomiko Advertising, and Studio Pierrot. The series, consisting of 112 episodes, aired from October 10, 1992, to December 17, 1994, on Fuji Television. The episodes were released on 23 video cassettes by Pony Canyon from January 1, 1995, to December 6, 1995. They were also released on 28 DVD volumes by Beam Entertainment, with volumes 8–14 being released on March 25, 2002, volumes 15–21 being released on April 25, 2002, and volumes 22–28 being released on May 25, 2002. The anime differed from its manga source material by containing different levels of violence and profanity, as well as minor variations in art style from one to the other. In early 2001, the series was acquired by Funimation Entertainment for North American distribution as Yu Yu Hakusho: Ghost Files. Funimation's production saw a significant contribution from voice actor Justin Cook, who not only directed the dub but also voiced the protagonist Yusuke.

The American-produced English dubbed episodes aired from February 23, 2002, to April 1, 2006, on Cartoon Network. Initially, the series was shown on the channel's Adult Swim programming block from February 2002 to April 2003, but was later moved to Toonami. Some of the show's original depictions of mature content including violence, sexual humor, and coarse language, as well as some controversial cultural discrepancies were edited out for broadcast. Yu Yu Hakusho was taken off Toonami around March 2005 and moved to an early Saturday morning time slot that October where the series finished its run. It was also aired uncut as part of the Funimation programming block on Colours TV in 2006 and the Funimation Channel in high-definition in 2011. Following Sony's acquisition of Crunchyroll, the series was moved to Crunchyroll.

The series was distributed in the United Kingdom by MVM Films and in Australia and New Zealand by Madman Entertainment. In India the English-language version of the series was released as Ghost Fighter. Yu Yu Hakusho was localized in the Philippines as Ghost Fighter and aired on IBC in the mid-1990s, as well as on GMA Network in 1999. This version of the dub localized the characters' names, such as changing "Yusuke" to "Eugene".

Funimation separated the series into four "seasons", that each compose their own story arc, which they refer to as "sagas". In North America, 32 DVD compilations have been released by Funimation for the four sagas, with the first released on April 16, 2002, and the last on July 19, 2005. The episodes have been released in both edited and uncut formats. In addition, DVD collection boxes have been released for all four sagas, each containing all the episodes of that particular saga, with the exception of the Dark Tournament Saga, which was split into two collection boxes. Funimation released season box sets of the anime starting with season one on July 8, 2008, and ending with season four on January 13, 2009. Each set contains four DVDs which have 28 episodes, or one quarter of the whole series. Funimation began releasing the seasons on Blu-ray Disc on May 31, 2011. Cook has stated that the production staff made minor improvements to their recordings, such as redubbing certain lines, cleaning up the dialogue, and removing "arrant anomalies". In Japan, three separate multi-disc DVD box sets were released, as well as 28 DVDs totaling all 112 episodes of the series. Japanese home video distributor Bandai Visual began releasing the series on Blu-ray Disc on October 27, 2009, with the first set containing a picture drama set after the end of the series that saw cast members reunite to record new dialogue.

Films and original video animations

Two animated films based on Yu Yu Hakusho have been produced. Both films have original storyline content that is not canonical to the manga. The first, simply titled Yu Yu Hakusho was released in Japan on July 10, 1993, as part of a seasonal film festival. In the movie, the protagonists Yusuke and Kuwabara are on a mission to rescue a kidnapped Koenma from a pair of demons who desire the Golden Seal, a stamp used for finalizing the sentencing of souls in the afterlife. AnimeWorks released an English dubbed version of the half-hour film on VHS in both English-dubbed and subtitled formats on May 5, 1998, and on DVD on January 30, 2001. , was released in Japanese theaters on April 9, 1994. The plot revolves around Yusuke and his friends defending the Human World against inhabitants of a fourth plane of existence called the "Netherworld". This full-length feature received its first English dubbed version by Central Park Media, which released it on VHS on March 3, 1998, and on DVD on October 8, 2002, under the name Yu Yu Hakusho the Movie: Poltergeist Report.

A series of Yu Yu Hakusho OVAs collectively titled  was released in Japan in VHS format between 1994 and 1996. The OVAs feature very short clips that take place after the end of the series. They also contain video montages from the anime, image songs, voice actor interviews, and satirical animated shorts focusing on the four protagonists. The OVAs consist of three volumes as well as an opening and ending encyclopedia. A four-DVD box set containing this series was released in Japan by Pony Canyon on December 15, 2004. Funimation dubbed the OVAs (though not the anime montages) and (re)dubbed the first theatrical film with their original cast from the anime, and released them both in North America in a two-disc DVD bundle titled  Yu Yu Hakusho: The Movie & Eizou Hakusho on December 13, 2011. This version splits up parts of the OVAs and does not include the Japanese voice actor interviews.

A brand new OVA of Yu Yu Hakusho was released with a Blu-ray box set of the series on October 26, 2018, in Japan. It adapts the "Two Shot" bonus chapter from the manga's seventh volume and the manga's penultimate chapter "All or Nothing". In October 2019, Funimation announced the OVA release with an English dub.

CDs
The music for the Yu Yu Hakusho anime adaptation was composed by Yusuke Honma. When Funimation gained rights to the series, English language versions of each of these songs were produced and arranged by musician Carl Finch. The localized opening theme is sung by Sara White and the closing themes are sung by members of the English cast including Stephanie Nadolny, Jerry Jewell, and Meredith McCoy.

A number of audio CDs have been released in Japan. The Yū Yū Hakusho Original Soundtrack was released in two separate volumes by Pony Canyon on January 18, 1997. The discs contain the show's instrumental tracks and some vocal themes. Also released on that day is Yū Yū Hakusho: Music Battle, a series of three albums featuring vocal tracks sung by the Japanese voice actors as their corresponding characters. Compilations of vocal songs including Yū Yū Hakusho Super Covers, Yū Yū Hakusho Super Dance Mix, and Legend of Yu Yu Hakusho: "Sai-Kyou" Best Selection Album were released on December 16, 1995, March 21, 1996, and March 21, 1997, respectively. Yū Yū Hakusho: Collective Songs and Yū Yū Hakusho: Collective Rare Trax, which contain covers of the theme songs performed by the series' voice actors, were both released on March 17, 1999. Two drama albums have been released by Shueisha, the first of which has an audio adaptation of the chapter "Yu Yu Hakusho Tales: Two Shot". A CD soundtrack for the second film and a maxi single with the vocal songs of Mawatari and Takahashi have also been published.

Video games

A number of video games have been developed that tie to the YuYu Hakusho series, most of which have been produced for and released exclusively in Japan. Prior to the launch of the franchise in North America, games were released on the Game Boy, Super Famicom, Sega consoles, and various platforms. North America only saw three video game releases. Two releases for the Nintendo's Game Boy Advanced handheld console, and one release for Sony's PlayStation 2 console. A single Mega Drive game, Yū Yū Hakusho Makyō Tōitsusen, was published in Brazil by Tectoy in 1999 under the title YuYu Hakusho: Sunset Fighters. When Atari gained publishing rights to Yu Yu Hakusho video games in 2003, the company created and released three games in these regions: Yu Yu Hakusho: Spirit Detective, an action-adventure game for the Game Boy Advance; Yu Yu Hakusho: Tournament Tactics, a tactical role-playing game also for the Game Boy Advance; and Yu Yu Hakusho: Dark Tournament, a 3D fighting game for the PlayStation 2.

Yu Yu Hakusho characters were also featured in the Weekly Shōnen Jump crossover fighting games J-Stars Victory VS and Jump Force. Yusuke, Hiei, and Toguro are playable in both games.

Live-action series
On December 16, 2020, a Japanese live-action series adaptation was announced, scheduled to premiere in December 2023. It will stream on Netflix worldwide, with Netflix contents acquisition director Kazutaka Sakamoto serving as executive producer and Akira Morii producing the series at Robot. On July 15, 2022, it was reported that Shō Tsukikawa will serve as the series director, with Tatsurō Mishima handling the script and Ryō Sakaguchi serving as the VFX supervisor. The series stars Takumi Kitamura as Yusuke Urameshi, Shuhei Uesugi as Kazuma Kuwabara, Jun Shison as Kurama and Kanata Hongō as Hiei.

Other media
An encyclopedia titled  was published by Shueisha on March 4, 2005. It contains extensive character profiles, story summaries, and an exclusive interview with Yoshihiro Togashi. An art book, was published by Shueisha on April 27, 2005. It is composed of pieces of artwork from the series, including illustrations created for the kanzenban edition reprints and an index of print material where each image was first used. Shueisha has also released two volumes of a guide book titled  and books based on both films, each containing screenshots organized in manga-style panels. In Japan, various collectibles such as trading figures, plush dolls, and gashapon toys also exist. A collectible card game based on the franchise was released by Movic. In North America, the series saw licensing for apparel from ODM, lines of action figures by IF Labs and Jakks Pacific, a Skannerz electronic toy from Radica Games, and an activities book from Scholastic. Score Entertainment created the Yu Yu Hakusho Trading Card Game for release in the United States. An English guidebook to the series titled Yu Yu Hakusho Uncovered: The Unofficial Guide was published by Cocoro Books on October 12, 2004.

A stage play adaptation produced by Office Endless was announced in May 2019. The play is written and directed by Chūji Mikasano, a screenwriter for the Tokyo Ghoul anime series. The play ran from August 8 to September 22, 2019, in Tokyo, Osaka, Fukuoka, and Aichi.

In September 2019, YuYu Hakusho joined the Universal Fighting System CCG, this marked the second anime license to make it into the system.

Reception

Manga
By 2013, YuYu Hakusho had over 50 million copies in circulation in Japan alone, making it one of Weekly Shonen Jump'''s best-selling manga series; by 2022, it had over 78 million copies in circulation. Patricia Duffield, a columnist for Animerica Extra, acknowledged the manga as "one of the kings of popularity in the mid-1990s" in the region where it saw mass availability from large bookstore chains to small train station kiosks. YuYu Hakusho earned Yoshihiro Togashi the Shogakukan Manga Award for shōnen in 1993. Towards the end of the series' run, Togashi was publicly criticized for not meeting chapter deadlines and for lower quality art. On TV Asahi's Manga Sōsenkyo 2021 poll, in which 150.000 people voted for their top 100 manga series, YuYu Hakusho ranked 17th.

In North America, several volumes of the manga have ranked within the weekly Nielsen BookScan graphic novels list, including volume five at both sixth and ninth in October 2004, volume six at sixth in February 2005, and volume seven at seventh in June 2005. In 2004, the YuYu Hakusho manga serialization sparked a controversy when a Florida grade school teacher issued a complaint about material found in an issue of the American Shonen Jump magazine purchased by a fifth-grade student at a Scholastic Book Fair. The complaint centered around portions of the manga containing violence, mild profanity, a character wearing a swastika, and another character smoking a cigarette. About 18,000 copies of the publication (out of 120,000) were returned from the fairs as a result of the matter. A Viz spokesperson defended the manga, clarifying that it is intended for older teens and that the alleged swastika is actually a Buddhist manji.

The YuYu Hakusho manga publication has received mixed criticism by reviewers in English-speaking regions. Martin Ouellette of the Canadian Protoculture Addicts compared the progression of the series to Dragon Ball Z and stated, "Togashi's art, while simple, is extremely efficient and the story is really fun." An older article by the same reviewer disagreed with the notion that YuYu Hakusho was similar to Dragon Ball, stating that the former franchise has better developed characters, more interesting action sequences, and more humor. Eduardo M. Chavez of Mania.com enjoyed the manga's artwork and found that the supporting characters tend to be illustrated with more detail than the main characters. He praised Lillian Olsen's English translation, but disliked Viz's use of overlaying English words to translate the expression of sound effects. In later volumes Chavez was dismayed by the transition of the manga from the early detective cases to the Dark Tournament arc. He asserted, "Seeing fight, after fight, after fight gets boring and this seriously is only the start of this trend." Dan Polley, a staff reviewer of Manga Life, gave an average grade to the fifth volume, which entails Yusuke's battle with Suzaku, the leader of the Four Beasts. Although he found some the battle sequences to be engaging, Polley judged the chapters as lacking in characterization and development overall. Polley also discounted the manga's comedy, considering the "bit gags or fairly lame jokes" to be "too much" at times.

Anime
The Yu Yu Hakusho television series was voted the best anime of the year in the 1994 and 1995 Animage Anime Grand Prix and the second best in 1993 after Sailor Moon. Additionally, the publication declared the series number 53 on its top 100 anime listing in 2001. In a 2006 web poll conducted in Japan by the network TV Asahi, Yu Yu Hakusho was voted as the 15th best anime of all time. The Japanese magazine Brutus voted it the sixth best anime of all time. The hit show garnered a large number of viewers during its run in Japan. Funimation president Gen Fukunaga remarked that Yu Yu Hakusho "came 'out of nowhere' to surprise people with huge ratings", which were just below those achieved by the popular series Dragon Ball Z. Yu Yu Hakusho was frequently watched by several age groups during its early run in North America. When it aired on Adult Swim, the anime, along with others such as Inuyasha and Cowboy Bebop, met with male audiences ages 18–34. During its Toonami debut in May 2003, Yu Yu Hakusho placed in seven out of the top 111 Nielsen ratings for Cartoon Network telecasts, with the highest being number 30 on May 13 at a two percent share of all viewing televisions in the country. Atari stated in December 2003 that the anime was one of the top-rated television programs in North America for males ages 9–14. Nielsen additionally reported that Yu Yu Hakusho tied with Dragon Ball GT as the top-rated Cartoon Network program for the same demographic during the week of September 28, 2004. It was the second highest-rated show among ages 12–17 the same week. Cartoon Network dropped the show from Toonami in March 2005 due to declining ratings. Yu Yu Hakusho proved to be popular in the Philippines, where it was rerun several times and managed to draw more viewers in the prime time slot than both local and foreign soap operas.

The animated series received a generally positive reception in North America. In January 2004, Yu Yu Hakusho was named the second best action-adventure anime by Anime Insider. It was voted by the users of IGN as the tenth best animated series of all time. Critical reviews focused on the series' attempt at a versatile balance of narrative, character development, and action sequences. Animerica's Justin Kovalsky defined Yu Yu Hakusho as a character-driven series and compared it to other anime like Phantom Quest Corp., Rurouni Kenshin, and Flame of Recca in that it successfully combines different ideas such as martial arts battles, character dynamics, the supernatural, and mythology. Allen Divers of the Anime News Network identified Yu Yu Hakusho as "one of the best action series out there", and noted consistently good storytelling and character development throughout his critique of key points of the series. Todd Douglass Jr. of DVD Talk declared, "It's a fun show with a great cast, a sense of humor, and a lot of action so there's no excuse not to at least give it a chance." He recommended the first three-season box sets of Yu Yu Hakusho, as well as the original boxset of the Three Kings Saga, but enjoyed the show's third season more than the others because of its multiple plotlines. N. S. Davidson of IGN concluded that having several concurrent plot branches is not enough for an anime to succeed, but that good writing, interesting characters, and action are also necessary. He proclaimed in his review of the anime's final episodes that Yu Yu Hakusho possesses all of these qualities. This was concurred upon by Joseph Luster of Otaku USA, who summed up his feelings about the universe of Yu Yu Hakusho by stating, "Togashi's world is eternally hellish and dark, but wildly varied. The only thing that doesn't change throughout its run is the fact that you'll still be rooting for the well-defined protagonists until the credits run on the last episode."

Jeffrey Harris of IGN was more critical when looking at later episodes, and felt that the end of the show's third arc involving the villain Sensui is too similar to the finale of the second arc with Toguro. He described the episodes as trying too hard to draw sympathy from the audience for the anime's villains. Despite his overall praise of Yu Yu Hakusho'', Divers noted in a review about one DVD release that the show "[walks] that fine line of a solid long running series or being a broken record". He also called the artwork of the first few episodes "dated" and pointed out questionable script choices regarding the English dub.

Aedan Juvet of Funimation called the anime influential and "timeless" with classic villains, highlighting five villains in the series which helped the anime evolve.

Notes

References

External links

  
 Official Studio Pierrot website 
 Official Viz website
 Official Funimation website()
 
 

YuYu Hakusho
1990 manga
1992 anime television series debuts
1992 Japanese television series debuts
Eizou Hakusho
Eizou Hakusho II
1994 Japanese television series endings
2023 Japanese television series debuts
Adventure anime and manga
Fiction about the afterlife
Anime series based on manga
Fuji TV original programming
Crunchyroll anime
Japanese television dramas based on manga
Japanese-language Netflix original programming
Madman Entertainment anime
Martial arts anime and manga
Manga adapted into films
Medialink
Pierrot (company)
Fiction about reincarnation
Shinigami in anime and manga
Shōnen manga
Shueisha franchises
Shueisha manga
Supernatural anime and manga
Toonami
Upcoming Netflix original programming
Viz Media manga
Yōkai in anime and manga
Winners of the Shogakukan Manga Award for shōnen manga